Tzi-Bʼalam was the tenth ruler of Copan. He was nicknamed Moon Jaguar by archaeologists. He was a son of Bʼalam Nehn, the 7th ruler. He was enthroned in May 553. His surviving monuments were found in the modern village of Copán Ruinas, which was a major complex during the Classic period. The most famous construction dating to his reign is the elaborate Rosalila phase of Temple 16, discovered entombed intact under later phases of the temple during archaeological tunneling work.

Notes

References

6th-century monarchs in North America
Rulers of Copán
578 deaths
Year of birth missing
6th century in the Maya civilization